Burikazganovo (Büreqaźğan) is a rural locality (a selo) and the administrative centre of Burikazganovsky Selsoviet, Sterlitamaksky District, Bashkortostan, Russia. The population was 799 as of 2010. There are 6 streets.

Geography 
Burikazganovo is located 15 km northwest of Sterlitamak (the district's administrative centre) by road. Novomukatovka is the nearest rural locality.

References 

Rural localities in Sterlitamaksky District